Christian Hirschbühl (born 19 April 1990) is an Austrian alpine ski racer. Hirschbuehl specializes in the technical events of slalom and giant slalom. Hirschbühl made his World Cup debut on 17 January 2015.

Career
Hirschbühl made his World Cup debut on 17 January 2015 in the Wengen slalom, but did not finish the first run. On 25 October 2015 at Sölden, he scored his first World Cup points, with a 22nd in the giant slalom.

World Cup results

Season standings

Race podiums
 1 win – (1 PG)
 1 podium – (1 PG); 12 top tens

References

External links

1990 births
Austrian male alpine skiers
Living people
Alpine skiers at the 2018 Winter Olympics
Olympic alpine skiers of Austria
People from Bregenz
Sportspeople from Vorarlberg
21st-century Austrian people